Events from the year 1665 in China.

Incumbents 
 Kangxi Emperor (4th year)
 Regents — Sonin, Ebilun, Suksaha, and Oboi

Viceroys
 Viceroy of Zhili — Miao Cheng (to July 4)
 Viceroy of Zhili, Shandong and Henan — Zhu Changzuo (July 13 –)
 Viceroy of Zhejiang — Zhao Tingchen
 Viceroy of Fujian — Zhu Changzuo
 Viceroy of Huguang — Zhang Changgeng
 Viceroy of Shaanxi — Bai Rumei
 Viceroy of Guangdong — Li Qifeng
 Viceroy of Guangxi — Qu Jinmei
 Viceroy of Liangguang — Lu Xingzu 
 Viceroy of Yun-Gui — Bian Sanyuan 
 Viceroy of Sichuan — Li Guoying
 Viceroy of Jiangnan —  Lang Tingzuo

Events 
 October or November — Kangxi Emperor marries Lady Hešeri, granddaughter of his regent Sonin and she becomes Empress Xiaochengren
 Another planned Qing invasion of the Kingdom of Tungning fails to occur due to a typhoon
 An embassy from the East-India Company, a Dutch-language account of China by Johan Nieuhof is published. The book served as a major influence in the rise of chinoiserie in the early eighteenth century
 Sino-Russian border conflicts

References

 

 
China